Last Exit is the third studio album by English rock band Traffic. Released in May 1969, it is a collection of odds and ends packaged by Island Records after the initial breakup of the band. The first half of the album consists of studio recordings, while the second half was recorded live at the Fillmore Auditorium. The album reached number 19 in the American Billboard 200 chart.

Cover
As implied by the cover photos, the album features the original lineup of Steve Winwood, Jim Capaldi, Chris Wood, and Dave Mason. Mason only appears on two tracks: "Just for You" and "Something's Got a Hold of My Toe". The original American LP released by United Artists Records has different cover artwork. The US front features a different picture of the band cut up into the shape of the band's logo with a black background.

Songs
Some of the studio recordings of this album were originally released on mono singles. The versions that appear on the album are in stereo.

"Just for You" was previously released in February 1968 as the A-side of a UK Dave Mason solo single. Conveniently for its use on this album, the other members of Traffic backed up Mason on this track. (The B-side was "Little Woman" on which Mason was backed by the band Family.) This single was released after Mason left Traffic the first time, following Mr. Fantasy.

"Medicated Goo" and "Shanghai Noodle Factory" were the A and B-sides of a UK Traffic single released in December 1968. The mono single version of "Medicated Goo" is a shorter edit with false ending that is not heard on the stereo album. The song would become a staple of the re-formed band's live performances in 1970-71.

"Something's Got a Hold of My Toe" is an instrumental and appears to be an outtake not originally intended for release. It is unclear why producer Jimmy Miller (a lyricist elsewhere on the album) gets a co-writing credit on this.

"Withering Tree" was previously released as the B-side to "Feelin' Alright" (September 1968), although the version on the LP is slightly different from the single. It was likely recorded while Dave Mason was still in the band, despite his absence from the recording.

"Feelin' Good" and "Blind Man", the two live recordings that make up the second half of the album, were recorded at the Fillmore Auditorium San Francisco on 14 March 1968. They were not written by the band members.

Reception

AllMusic's retrospective review said that Last Exit, though weaker than its two predecessors, "isn't bad as profit-taking products go." They complimented most of the studio tracks as highly appealing works, and praised the cohesive jamming on the live tracks.

Track listing

Personnel
Traffic
 Steve Winwood – organ, lead vocals (all but 1, 3), piano, bass, guitar (2, 5)
 Dave Mason – guitar (1, 3), lead vocals (1)
 Chris Wood – flute, saxophone, organ
 Jim Capaldi – drums, percussion, backing vocals
Technical
 Guy Stevens, Mike Sida – art direction
 Francine Winham, Raymond Ross, Richard Polak – photography

Release history

References

Traffic (band) albums
1969 albums
Albums produced by Jimmy Miller
Island Records albums
Progressive rock albums by English artists
United Artists Records albums
PolyGram albums
albums recorded at Morgan Sound Studios